Gynostemma is a genus of perennial climbing vines in the cucumber, gourd, and melon family, comprising at least 19 species, all native to the tropical East or Far East, inclusive of the Himalayas: China (with 9 endemic); the islands of Japan; Malaysia; and New Guinea. The term Gynostemma is derived from Ancient Greek γυνή meaning "woman" or "female", and στέμμα meaning "wreath" or "garland". In (post-)classical Latin the form stemma is attested as Greek loanword. In Ancient Greek and Latin, stemma is of neuter gender. German-Dutch botanist Carl Ludwig Blume described Gynostemma from two species he named: G. pedata (later changed, to pedatum) and G. simplicifolia (also later changed, to simplicifolium). Neither species was clearly designated by him as the type; however, the former species, G. pedatum is now considered to be a synonym of G. pentaphyllum (Thunb.) Makino. The genus was published in 1825, in Carl Ludwig von Blume's Bijdragen tot de flora van Nederlandsch Indië ("Contributions to the flora of the Dutch East Indies").

General description
All species of Gynostemma have tendrils (usually branching); most are dioecious. The leaves are usually in palmately arrayed leaflets (3–9, ovate-lanceolate in shape), arranged alternately on the stem; a few species are leaved, but without leaflets. Inflorescences are either racemose or paniculate. Fruits can be capsular or pea-like, containing two or three seeds.

Selected species
 Gynostemma aggregatum C.Y.Wu & S.K.Chen
 Gynostemma burmanicum King ex Chakrav.
 Gynostemma cardiospermum Cogn. ex Oliv.
 Gynostemma caulopterum S.Z.He
 Gynostemma compressum X.X.Chen & D.R.Liang
 Gynostemma guangxiense X.X.Chen & D.H.Qin
 Gynostemma intermedium W.J.de Wilde & Duyfjes
 Gynostemma laxiflorum C.Y.Wu & S.K.Chen
 Gynostemma laxum (Wall.) Cogn.
 Gynostemma longipes C.Y.Wu
 Gynostemma microspermum C.Y.Wu & S.K.Chen
 Gynostemma pallidinervee Z.Zhang
 Gynostemma papuanum W.J.de Wilde & Duyfjes
 Gynostemma pentagynum Z.P.Wang
 Gynostemma pentaphyllum (Thunb.) Makino
 Gynostemma pubescens (Gagnep.) C.Y.Wu
 Gynostemma simplicifolium Blume
 Gynostemma yixingense (Z.P.Wang & Q.Z.Xie) C.Y.Wu & S.K.Chen
 Gynostemma zhejiangense X.J.Xue
 List source :

References

Cucurbitaceae
Cucurbitaceae genera
Dioecious plants